Orere Point Regional Park is a regional park situated south-east of Auckland in New Zealand's North Island. It is owned and operated by Auckland Council. It is located in Ōrere Point in Franklin, in the Auckland Region.

References 

Franklin Local Board Area
Parks in Auckland
Regional parks of New Zealand
Tourist attractions in the Auckland Region